Outback is a jazz album by Joe Farrell on the CTI Records label. It was recorded at the Van Gelder Studio in November 1971.

Track listing

Side one 
"Outback (From the Motion Picture Outback)" (John Scott) – 8:40
"Sound Down" (Joe Farrell, Geri Farrell) – 8:30

Side two 
"Bleeding Orchid" (Chick Corea) – 6:45
"November 68th" (Joe Farrell) – 9:25

Personnel 
Musisions
 Joe Farrell – Tenor and soprano saxophone, flute, alto flute, piccolo
 Chick Corea – Electric piano
 Elvin Jones – Drums
 Buster Williams – Bass
 Airto Moreira – Percussion

Production'
 Engineer – Rudy Van Gelder
 Cover photograph – Pete Turner
 Liner photographs – Chuck Stewart
 Album design – Bob Ciano

References 

1972 albums
Joe Farrell albums
Chick Corea albums
Albums produced by Creed Taylor
Albums recorded at Van Gelder Studio